Piet den Boer (born 17 March 1958 in the Netherlands) is a Dutch retired footballer. He scored the winning goal for Belgian side KV Mechelen in the 1988 European Cup Winners' Cup Final.

Honours

Player 
KV Mechelen

 Belgian Second Division: 1982–83
 Belgian First Division: 1988–89
 Belgian Cup: 1986–87
 European Cup Winners Cup: 1987–88 (winners)
 European Super Cup: 1988

Individual 

 Dutch First Division: 1981-82 top scorer (26 goals)

References

Dutch footballers
Living people
1958 births
Association football forwards
Excelsior Rotterdam players
K.V. Mechelen players
FC Girondins de Bordeaux players
Stade Malherbe Caen players